The 2012–13 UCI Asia Tour was the 9th season of the UCI Asia Tour. The season began on 20 October 2012 with the Tour of Hainan and ended on 30 September 2013 with the Tour of China II.

The points leader, based on the cumulative results of previous races, wears the UCI Asia Tour cycling jersey. Hossein Alizadeh from Iran was the defending champion of the 2011–12 UCI Asia Tour. Julián Arredondo from Colombia was crowned as the 2012–13 UCI Asia Tour champion.

Throughout the season, points are awarded to the top finishers of stages within stage races and the final general classification standings of each of the stages races and one-day events. The quality and complexity of a race also determines how many points are awarded to the top finishers, the higher the UCI rating of a race, the more points are awarded.

The UCI ratings from highest to lowest are as follows:
 Multi-day events: 2.HC, 2.1 and 2.2
 One-day events: 1.HC, 1.1 and 1.2

Events

2012

2013

Final standings
There is a competition for the rider, team and country with the most points gained from winning or achieving a high place in the above races.

As of 30 September 2013

Individual classification

Team classification

Nation classification

Nation under-23 classification

External links
 

UCI Asia Tour
2013 in men's road cycling
2012 in road cycling
UCI
UCI